Michigan Phoenix was an American women's soccer team, founded in 2005. The team was a member of the Women's Premier Soccer League, the second tier of women’s soccer in the United States and Canada, until 2006, when the team left the league and the franchise was terminated.

Year-by-year

   

Women's Premier Soccer League teams
Women's soccer clubs in the United States
Soccer clubs in Michigan
2005 establishments in Michigan
2006 disestablishments in Michigan
Association football clubs established in 2005
Association football clubs disestablished in 2006
Women's sports in Michigan